A metabolic network is the complete set of metabolic and physical processes that determine the physiological and biochemical properties of a cell. As such, these networks comprise the chemical reactions of metabolism, the metabolic pathways, as well as the regulatory interactions that guide these reactions.

With the sequencing of complete genomes, it is now possible to reconstruct the network of biochemical reactions in many organisms, from bacteria to human. Several of these networks are available online:
Kyoto Encyclopedia of Genes and Genomes (KEGG), EcoCyc, BioCyc and metaTIGER.
Metabolic networks are powerful tools for studying and modelling metabolism.

Uses
Metabolic networks can be used to detect comorbidity patterns in diseased patients. Certain diseases, such as obesity and diabetes, can be present in the same individual concurrently, sometimes one disease being a significant risk factor for the other disease. The disease phenotypes themselves are normally the consequence of the cell's inability to breakdown or produce an essential substrate. However, an enzyme defect at one reaction may affect the fluxes of other subsequent reactions. These cascading effects couple the metabolic diseases associated with subsequent reactions resulting in comorbidity effects. Thus, metabolic disease networks can be used to determine if two disorders are connected due to their correlated reactions.

See also
Metabolic network modelling
Metabolic pathway

References

Metabolism